Lalchand Meghwal may refer to:

Lalchand Fulamali, Indian politician
Lalchand Hirachand,  Indian industrialist
Lalchand Kataria, Indian politician
Lalchand Rajput, Indian cricketer

See also
Lal Chand (disambiguation)